The 2014 Big Ten Conference Men's Ice Hockey Tournament was the first tournament in conference history, and was played between March 20 and March 22, 2014 at the Xcel Energy Center in Saint Paul, Minnesota. The winner of the tournament was the Wisconsin Badgers, who earned the Big Ten's automatic bid to the 2014 NCAA Division I Men's Ice Hockey Tournament.

Format
All six Big Ten teams participated in the tournament, which was a single-elimination format. Teams were seeded No. 1 through No. 6 according to the final regular season conference standings. In the quarterfinals on Thursday, No. 3 played No. 6 and No. 4 played No. 5. On Friday, No. 2 played the winner of the first game and No. 1 played the winner of the second game (the teams were not reseeded). The two semifinal winners played each other on Saturday in the final.

Conference standings
Note: GP = Games played; W = Wins; L = Losses; T = Ties; PTS = Points; GF = Goals For; GA = Goals Against

Bracket

Note: * denotes overtime periods

Quarterfinals
All times are local (UTC−5).

(3) Michigan vs. (6) Penn State

(4) Ohio State vs. (5) Michigan State

Semifinals
All times are local (UTC−5).

(2) Wisconsin vs. (6) Penn State

(1) Minnesota vs. (4) Ohio State

Championship
All times are local (UTC−5).

(2) Wisconsin vs. (4) Ohio State

Tournament awards

Most Outstanding Player
 Center: Mark Zengerle

All-Tournament Team
 Goaltender: Christian Frey (Ohio State)
 Defensemen: Drew Brevig (Ohio State), Frankie Simonelli (Wisconsin)
 Forwards: Ryan Dzingel (Ohio State), Michael Mersch (Wisconsin), Mark Zengerle (Wisconsin)

References

External links
 Big Ten Tournament information

Big Ten Men's Ice Hockey Tournament
Big Ten Men's Ice Hockey Tournament